John Hawk or Johnny Hawk may refer to:

John D. Hawk (1924–2013), U.S. Army soldier and Medal of Honor recipient
John Layfield (born 1966), American professional wrestler whose stage names included John Hawk and Johnny Hawk
John Hawk, fictional character portrayed by Burt Reynolds in the American television series Hawk
Johnny Hawk, an alternate name for British electronic musician Global Goon

See also
John Hawke (disambiguation)
John Hawkes (disambiguation)
John Hawks (disambiguation)